Kevin Kiely is an Irish politician and former Mayor of Limerick from 2009–10. He was made a Peace Commissioner in 1983 by the then Fine Gael Minister for Justice, Michael Noonan. He is a member of Fine Gael.

Career in politics
He was first elected to Limerick City Council in 1985. He was re-elected to the council in June 2009.  He is a member of the Governing Authority of the University of Limerick. He is Chairman of Limerick City Council Joint Policing and a former Chairman of Limerick City Council Future Planning. He is married with two children. In November 2009, he called for unemployed European Union nationals to be deported from Ireland. His views led to a debate over racism. This was part of a broader controversy surrounding racist comments from Fine Gael members in Limerick.

In March 2010, he called for a change to the law which bans selling alcohol on Good Friday and Christmas Day, at a time when a rugby match was due to take place in Limerick city. Shortly before leaving office in June 2010, he again was the subject of national news when he called for the re-introduction of capital punishment.

Departure from Fine Gael
He left Fine Gael, over the party's failure to select him as a candidate for the 2011 Irish general election. He unsuccessfully ran as an Independent candidate for the constituency of Limerick City.

References

External links
RTÉ News: Town and city councils elect mayors, 15 June 2009
Kenny criticises deportation remark, The Irish Times, 14 November 2009
MAYOR KEVIN KIELY'S STATEMENT FOLLOWING COMMENTS ABOUT EU NATIONALS Live95 FM Radio station, 12 November 2009
Irish government to pay immigrants to go home The Observer, 15 November 2009
Easy to raise race to quell debate on welfare tourists The Irish Independent, 15 November 2009
The Leader Interview with Cllr Kevin Kiely, chairman of the joint policing committee The Limerick Leader, 15 May 2008

Mayors of Limerick (city)
Living people
Fine Gael politicians
Local councillors in County Limerick
Year of birth missing (living people)